Stake is an Australian financial services company headquartered in Sydney, Australia. It was founded in 2017 by Matt Leibowitz and Dan Silver. Stake predominately offers low-cost brokerage services to retail investors in Australia, New Zealand, Brazil and the United Kingdom.

As of February 2022, Stake had over 450,000 users, making it the third-largest online broker in Australia.

History 
Stake was created in 2017 to enable Australians to trade shares on the NYSE and NASDAQ, which at the time was a novelty in Australia. The company was created by Matt Leibowitz, a former partner in the derivatives trading firm Optiver, and Dan Silver.

In 2019, Stake raised $AU 3.5 million from Ellemby Capital and its chairman, Brazilian entrepreneur and investor Sergio Kulikovsky. The company claimed to be trading profitably at this time.

As a low-cost broker targeted towards retail investors, Stake played a pivotal role in the GameStop short squeeze in Australia. Following coverage on the GameStop saga on media and social media, thousands of investors joined the Stake platform to participate in GameStock trading. On 28 January 2021, Stake reported tech outages as a result of a sudden increase in new users. On 1 February 2021, US broker-dealer DriveWealth significantly raised its capital requirements for trading in the GameStop stock in an attempt to tame the wild fluctuations in price. Since DriveWealth is Stake's broker partner, Stake was forced to stop trading in Gamestop. 

In May 2021, Stake raised an additional $AU 40 million from Tiger Global Management and DST Global to expand into other markets.

In November 2021, Stake was recognised as the 7th fastest growing company in Australia.

In December 2021, Stake launched the ability for the Australian public to trade shares on the ASX and Chi-x.

In April 2022, Stake announced that it had raised a further $AU 50 million from Tiger Global Management and DST Global to complete its Series A funding. At this time, Stake reported that it had $AU 2 billion in assets under management and was generating $AU 20 million in revenue per year.

References 

Australian companies established in 2017
Online brokerages
Financial services companies of Australia
Financial services companies based in Sydney
Online financial services companies of Australia
Investment companies of Australia